Digger T. Rock: Legend of the Lost City is a platform video game developed by Rare and published by the Milton Bradley Company for the Nintendo Entertainment System. It was first released in North America in December 1990 and in Europe in 1991. The game centres around the miner Digger T. Rock, as he spelunks various caves and catacombs whilst searching for the mythical Lost City.

The game was the first game to be developed by the newly re-branded Rare, whereas the first game to be released under the company was Solar Jetman, earlier in 1990. The game received mixed reviews upon release, with praise directed at its playability but was criticised for its poor graphics and presentation. It was later included in Rare's 2015 Xbox One retrospective compilation, Rare Replay.

Gameplay

The game is divided into eight caverns, which must be explored whilst avoiding death from enemy attacks, cave-ins, and fatal falls. The player-character, Digger T. Rock, can utilise multiple tools such as ladders, shovels, armour, and explosives, which can be used to explore and discover new areas. Monsters such as moles, mosquitoes, and dragons seek to kill the player-character. Digger's only defence is his shovel, which can be used to attack enemies as well as mining stone. The player starts the game with three lives.

The goal in each cavern is to locate both the end of level door and the special pillar which unlocks it. When stepped on, the pillar activates a countdown timer, during which the door is open. Once the timer is active, the player must get to the door before the timer ends and the door re-closes. There are multiple bonus games in between levels where the player can amass more treasure. Later levels include caveman villages where the player can purchase new tools with collected treasure as a currency.

Development
Ultimate Play the Game was founded by brothers Tim and Chris Stamper, along with Tim's wife, Carol, from their headquarters in Ashby-de-la-Zouch in 1982. They began producing multiple video games for the ZX Spectrum throughout the early 1980s. The company were known for their reluctance to reveal details about their operations and upcoming projects. Little was known about their development process except that they used to work in "separate teams"; one team would work on graphics whilst the other would concentrate on other aspects such as sound or graphics.

Digger T. Rock was the first game to be developed by the newly re-branded Rare. During the late 1980s, the Stamper brothers sold the rights of Ultimate Play the Game to U.S. Gold and shifted their focus from the British home computing market to broader home console gaming. Rare became one of the first western developers to be granted a licence by Nintendo to produce games for the Nintendo Entertainment System, during which Rare began employing more staff and expanding their operations in order to develop more games for home consoles. Digger T. Rock and Solar Jetman were the first games by Rare to be released on a Nintendo console, both in 1990. They were both later included in Rare's 2015 Xbox One retrospective compilation, Rare Replay.

Reception

The game received mixed reviews upon release. Julian Rignall of Mean Machines compared the game to Boulderdash, stating that Digger T. Rock offers superior gameplay and graphics. Steve Jarrett of Total! criticised the graphics, stating that the dominant rocky landscapes were "too barren". Rignall, on the other hand, stated that the graphics were well-animated and the sprites to be "neatly-defined". However, Rignall criticised the game's presentation, noting that the introduction and options of the game were "sparse". AllGame's Skyler Miller described the game's environments as "simple but well-defined", though felt that the game "falls short in the action department".

The playability and "life-span" of the game also gained mixed views. Rignall praised the game's playability and "lastability", stating that the game is "easy to get into" and was addictive. Regarding its replay value, Rignall asserted that the large number of levels in the game would keep the player occupied and provided an "enjoyable challenge". Jarrett stated the game requires "a lot of patience" and found certain aspects of it frustrating at times, especially the time limit required to progress to the next level. Jarrett also noted the number of levels to be "excessive", and stated that he suspected "players may not want to dig that deep".

Notes

References

1990 video games
Nintendo Entertainment System games
Platform games
Rare (company) games
Side-scrolling video games
Single-player video games
Video games scored by David Wise
Video games developed in the United Kingdom
Milton Bradley Company video games